Coenzyme Q5, more commonly known as COQ5, is a coenzyme involved in the electron transport chain. It is a shorter-chain homolog of coenzyme Q10 (ubiquinone), the more-common coenzyme of this family.

References

1,4-Benzoquinones
Methoxy compounds
Coenzymes